Philip Champion (born June 13, 1976 in Fort Campbell, KY and raised in Jacksonville, FL) also known as Hot Sauce, is an American former professional basketball player who has played on the Streetball AND1 Mixtape Tour from its creation in 2002.

In 2006, he played a role in the movie Crossover. In 2018, the Atlanta Hawks offered a promotion in which fans had the opportunity to guard Champion 1 on 1 for 24 seconds to win prizes.

Professional career

College Park Spyders (2009–2012) 
In January 2009, it was announced that Champion had signed with the College Park Spyders of the present American Basketball Association.

References

1976 births
AND1
Basketball players from Jacksonville, Florida
Living people
American men's basketball players